4263 Abashiri, provisional designation , is a stony Flora asteroid from the inner regions of the asteroid belt, approximately 8 kilometers in diameter.

The asteroid was discovered on 7 September 1989, by Japanese astronomers Masayuki Yanai and Kazuro Watanabe at Kitami Observatory in eastern Hokkaidō, Japan. It was named for the Japanese city of Abashiri.

Orbit and classification 

Abashiri is a member of the Flora family, one of the largest groups of stony asteroids in the main-belt. It orbits the Sun in the inner main-belt at a distance of 1.9–2.5 AU once every 3 years and 4 months (1,220 days). Its orbit has an eccentricity of 0.14 and an inclination of 6° with respect to the ecliptic. Due to a precovery obtained at Palomar Observatory in 1951, the asteroid's observation arc could be extended by 38 years prior to its discovery.

Physical characteristics 

Abashiri has been characterized as a stony S-type asteroid.

Rotation period 

Between 2008 and 2016, three rotational lightcurves of Abashiri were obtained by Czech astronomer Petr Pravec at Ondřejov Observatory. Lightcurve analysis gave a well-defined rotation period of between 4.8817 and 4.88230 hours with a corresponding brightness variation between 0.11 and 0.42 magnitude.

Diameter and albedo 

According to the survey carried out by NASA's Wide-field Infrared Survey Explorer with its subsequent NEOWISE mission, Abashiri measures 9.0 kilometers in diameter and its surface has an albedo of 0.20, while the Collaborative Asteroid Lightcurve Link assumes an albedo of 0.24, derived from 8 Flora, the Flora family's largest member and namesake, and calculates a somewhat smaller diameter of 7.2 kilometers.

Naming 

This minor planet was named for the Japanese city of Abashiri, known for its fishing industry. It is located at the Sea of Okhotsk, about 50 kilometers east of Kitami, in the eastern part of the island of Hokkaidō. The minor planets, 3720 Hokkaido and 3785 Kitami are named after the island and city, respectively. The official naming citation was published by the Minor Planet Center on 21 November 1991 .

Notes

References

External links 
 Asteroid Lightcurve Database (LCDB), query form (info )
 Dictionary of Minor Planet Names, Google books
 Asteroids and comets rotation curves, CdR – Observatoire de Genève, Raoul Behrend
 Discovery Circumstances: Numbered Minor Planets (1)-(5000) – Minor Planet Center
 
 

004263
Discoveries by Masayuki Yanai
Discoveries by Kazuro Watanabe
Named minor planets
19890907